21st Century Fox is the fifth studio album of British model-turned-singer Samantha Fox. The eurodance-pop album was released by Ichiban Records in 1997. The title is a play on major film studio 20th Century Fox.

After a six-year hiatus, Samantha Fox returned to the studio to record her fifth album, 21st Century Fox. She had a new look and a new style in music. In fact, this album focused on the dance genre and was a big hit in clubs around Europe. The first song released was "Deeper", which was unsuccessful, though receiving a lot of airplay. She released her first single, "Let Me Be Free", which marked a comeback for her, charting in some European countries. The video shows Fox in the box ring with a male lover. Further singles were the Latin-flavoured "The Reason Is You (One on One)" and "Perhaps".

Track listings

Watching You, Watching Me
A remixed version of 21st Century Fox was released by Phantom Records as Watching You, Watching Me in 2002.

References

1997 albums
Samantha Fox albums
2002 remix albums